Farhad Majid oghlu Hajiyev (1980, Sumgait) is the Deputy Minister of Youth and Sports of Azerbaijan Republic.

Biography 
Farhad Hajiyev was born in 1980 in Sumgait. He received a bachelor's degree in International Relations at Azerbaijan University in 1995–1999 and a master's degree in 1999–2001. In 2007 he graduated from Azerbaijan State University of Economics with a master's degree in finance. He graduated from the course of Harvard Kennedy School for senior government officials in 2008. He is a PhD in Philosophical Sciences.

Career 
In 2000–2001 Farhad Hajiyev worked as a department head, chairman of the assembly, secretary general of the National Council of Youth Organizations of  Azerbaijan Republic. In 2001, he was appointed Head of the Sector for Work with International Organizations at Ministry of Youth and Sports of the Republic of Azerbaijan. In November 2002, he was appointed Head of the Youth Affairs Department of the Ministry of Youth and Sports. From 2006 to 2009, he served as Chairman of the Council of Europe's Youth Affairs Program Committee.

From 2012 to 2018 he worked as the Executive Director of the Youth Foundation under the President of the Republic of Azerbaijan. In 2018, he was appointed Deputy Minister of Youth and Sports of the Republic of Azerbaijan by the Order of the President of the Republic of Azerbaijan.

Awards 
 For service to the Fatherland Order (3rd degree) — July 24, 2019
 Medal "For Distinction in Civil Service" — February 8, 2011
 Honorary Diploma of President — June 29, 2015

References 

living people
1980 births
Azerbaijani politicians
People from Sumgait